Eric Banks (born January 30, 1998) is an American football defensive end for the Arizona Cardinals of the National Football League (NFL). He played college football at UTSA.

College career
Banks was a member of the UTSA Roadrunners for four seasons. He finished his collegiate career with 81 tackles, 20.5 tackles for loss, and 7.5 sacks with one fumble recovery and five forced fumbles over 48 games played.

Professional career

Los Angeles Rams
Banks was signed by the Los Angeles Rams as an undrafted free agent following the 2020 NFL Draft on April 25, 2020. He initially made the Rams' 53-man roster out of training camp. Banks was waived from the active roster on October 10, 2020, and then resigned to the team's practice squad on October 13. He signed a reserve/futures contract with the Rams on January 18, 2021. Banks was waived by the Rams during final roster cuts on August 31, 2021.

Los Angeles Chargers
Banks was claimed off waivers by the Los Angeles Chargers on September 1, 2021. On September 30, 2021, Banks was released by the Chargers.

Detroit Lions
On October 1, 2021, Banks was claimed off waivers by the Detroit Lions. On October 28, 2021, Banks was waived by the Lions and re-signed to the practice squad. He signed a reserve/future contract with the Lions on January 10, 2022.

On August 30, 2022, Banks was waived/injured by the Lions and placed on injured reserve. He was released on September 5.

Arizona Cardinals
On November 2, 2022, Banks was signed to the Arizona Cardinals practice squad. He was promoted to the active roster on January 7, 2023.

References

External links
Los Angeles Chargers bio
UTSA Roadrunners football bio

1998 births
Living people
Players of American football from Memphis, Tennessee
American football defensive ends
UTSA Roadrunners football players
Los Angeles Chargers players
Los Angeles Rams players
Detroit Lions players
Arizona Cardinals players